The 2016 U.S. Classic, known as the 2016 Secret U.S. Classic for sponsorship reasons, was the 33rd edition of the U.S. Classic gymnastics tournament. The competition was held on June 4, 2016, at the XL Center in Hartford, Connecticut.

Historically, it was the first time the competition was held in the city of Hartford, or indeed the state of Connecticut. Additionally, being held in conjunction with the men's P&G U.S. Nationals, it was the first edition to have been combined with the event. The competition served as the start of the 2016 USA Gymnastics elite season and, although not officially, the start of the USA Gymnastics 2016 Olympics team selection process.

Tickets for the event went on sale on January 15, 2016.

Medalists

Participants

Seniors
 Alyssa Baumann – Plano, Texas (WOGA) florida
 Simone Biles – Spring, Texas (WCC) professional
 Leah Clapper – Ann Arbor, Michigan (Twistars USA, Inc.) florida 
 Kaitlin DeGuzman – Rowlett, Texas (Metroplex)
 Christina Desiderio – Hackettstown, New Jersey (Parkettes) lsu
 Gabby Douglas – Tarzana, California (Buckeye) professional
 Brenna Dowell – Odessa, Missouri (GAGE) ou
 Jazmyn Foberg – Bayville, New Jersey (MG Elite, Inc.) florida
 Margzetta Frazier – Erial, New Jersey (Parkettes) ucla
 Emily Gaskins – Coral Springs, Florida (Palm Beach)
 Rachel Gowey – Urbandale, Iowa (Chow's)
 Laurie Hernandez – Old Bridge, New Jersey (MG Elite, Inc.)professional
 Amelia Hundley – Hamilton, Ohio (Cincinnati)
 Madison Kocian – Dallas, Texas (WOGA)
 Maggie Musselman – Crownsville, Maryland (Hill's)
 Abby Paulson – Coon Rapids, Minnesota (Twin City Twisters)
 Ashton Locklear – Hamlet, North Carolina (Everest)
 Lauren Navarro – La Verne, California (Charter Oak)
 Aly Raisman – Needham, Massachusetts (Brestyan's)professional
 Lexy Ramler – St. Michael, Minnesota (KidSport, LLC.)
 Emily Schild – Huntersville, North Carolina (Everest)
 MyKayla Skinner – Gilbert, Arizona (Desert Lights) utah
 Ragan Smith – Lewisville, Texas (Texas Dreams)ou
 Olivia Trautman – Champlin, Minnesota (Twin City Twisters)

References 

U.S. Classic
U.S. Classic
U.S. Classic
U.S. Classic